The University of Applied Sciences and Arts of Western Switzerland is situated in Western Switzerland. It is formally accredited by the Swiss Accreditation Council. The university is divided into six faculties: Design and Fine Arts; Business, Management and Services; Engineering and Architecture; Music and Performing Arts; Health; and Social Work.

The University of Applied Sciences and Arts and its schools
The HES-SO University of Applied Sciences and Arts of Western Switzerland (HES-SO Haute école spécialisée de Suisse occidentale) comprises 28 institutions of higher education. Its various study streams and research activities fall into six faculties: Design and Fine Arts; Business, Management and Services; Engineering and Architecture; Music and Performing Arts; Health; and Social Work.

Various Bachelor, Master, MBA degrees are awarded by affiliated schools.

HE-ARC
 HE-Arc Conservation-restauration
 Haute école de gestion (HEG-Arc)
 HE-Arc Ingénierie 
 HE-Arc Santé

HES-SO Fribourg
 Haute école d'ingénierie et d'architecture de Fribourg (HEIA-FR)
 Haute école de gestion Fribourg (HEG-FR)
 Haute école de santé Fribourg (HEdS-FR)
 Haute école de travail social Fribourg (HETS-FR)

HES-SO Genève
 Haute école d'art et de design de Genève (HEAD)
 Haute école du Paysage, d'Ingénierie et d'Architecture (Hepia) 
 Haute école de gestion Genève (HEG Genève)
 Haute école de santé Genève (HEdS-GE)
 Haute école de travail social Genève (HETS-GE)
 Haute école de musique (HEM)

HES-SO Valais-Wallis
 École cantonale d'art du Valais (ECAV)
 Haute école de gestion & Tourisme (HEGT)
 Haute école de travail social Valais (HETS-VS)
 Haute école de santé Valais (HEdS-VS)
 Haute école d'ingénierie Valais (HEI-VS)

Hautes écoles vaudoises de type HES
 Haute école d'ingénierie et de gestion du canton de Vaud (HEIG-VD)
 École cantonale d'art de Lausanne (ECAL)
 Haute école de la santé - La Source 
 Haute école de la santé Vaud (HESAV)
 Haute école de travail social et de la santé (HETSL)
 Haute école de musique de Lausanne (HEMU)

Hautes écoles associées à la HES-SO par une convention
 Haute école de viticulture et oenologie de Changins
 École hôtelière de Lausanne (EHL)
 Haute école des arts de la scène - La Manufacture

Master's degree
The University also offer numerous Master's degrees. Most applied master's degree courses take place in multiple affiliated schools while the central courses are given on the Lausanne Campus. Selected programs:

 Master of Arts HES-SO/BFH in Architecture (Jointmaster)
 Master of Arts HES-SO en Travail social (avril or novembre)
 Master of Science HES-SO in Life Sciences
 Master of Science HES-SO Integrated Innovation for Product and Business Development (Innokick)
 Master of Science HES-SO in Engineering (MSE), with 3 possible orientations:
 Technologies industrielles (TIN)
 Technologies énergétiques (TE)
 Technologies de l'Information et de la Communication (TIC)
 Master of Science HES-SO en Ingénierie du territoire
 Master UNIL-HES-SO in Nursing Sciences (MSc SI)
 Master UNIL-HES-SO in Health Sciences (MSc Sa)
 Master of Science HES-SO en Business Administration, with 3 possible orientations:
 Entrepreneurship
 Management des Systèmes d'information
 Management et Ingénierie des services

See also
 List of largest universities by enrollment in Switzerland

References

External links
 Official website
 Information about the University of Applied Sciences Western Switzerland

Universities of Applied Sciences in Switzerland